The 1990 Mercedes Cup,  was a men's tennis tournament played on outdoor clay courts and held at the Tennis Club Weissenhof in Stuttgart, West Germany that was part of the Championship Series of the 1990 ATP Tour. It was the 13th edition of the tournament was held from 16 July until 22 July 1990. Tenth-seeded Goran Ivanišević won the singles title.

Finals

Singles

 Goran Ivanišević defeated  Guillermo Pérez Roldán, 6–7(2–7), 6–1, 6–4, 7–6(7–5)
 It was Ivanišević' first singles title of his career.

Doubles

 Pieter Aldrich /  Danie Visser defeated  Per Henricsson /  Nicklas Utgren, 6–3, 6–4

References

External links
 Official website 
 ITF tournament edition details
 ATP tournament profile

Mercedes Cup
Stuttgart Open
1990 in German tennis
July 1990 sports events in Europe